Sweet Lips or Sweetlips may refer to:

Sweet Lips, Tennessee, an unincorporated community in Chester County
"Sweet Lips", a song by Monaco (band)
Sweet Lips, George Washington's dog, see United States presidential pets
Sweetlips (fish), a common name for the fishes in the subfamily Plectorhynchinae